Sarisophora designata is a moth in the family Lecithoceridae. It was described by Kyu-Tek Park in 2012. It is found in Papua New Guinea.

References

Moths described in 2012
Sarisophora